Eugene Thomas Puerling (March 31, 1929 – March 25, 2008) was a vocal performer and vocal arranger. He was born in Milwaukee, Wisconsin.  Puerling created and led the vocal groups The Hi-Lo's and The Singers Unlimited.  He was awarded a Grammy Award for Best Vocal Arrangement for Two or More Voices in 1982 for his arrangement of "A Nightingale Sang in Berkeley Square" (as performed by The Manhattan Transfer).  A Latin song he arranged for Singers Unlimited, "One More Time, Chuck Corea," inspired by Chuck Mangione and Chick Corea, has been adapted and used by marching bands, drum and bugle corps and jazz ensembles.  He died just six days before his 79th birthday, due to complications from diabetes.

Puerling's vocal arrangements and chord structures were classic and instantly recognizable. In addition to the Hi-Lo's and The Singers Unlimited he contributed to Rosemary Clooney's TV show and mentored many other singers and groups, including Take 6. His vocal arranging ability and his ability to arrange musical backing by Frank Comstock's band and several others was widely regarded; John Neal of Harmony Sweepstakes said after his death: "As a craftsman of the art of blending and harmonizing the human voice in song, Gene has no equal."

Legacy
Puerling's innovative use of vocal harmony influenced many groups and musicians, including Take 6, The King's Singers, The Manhattan Transfer, Chanticleer, Glad (band), The Free Design, and Brian Wilson.

Several groups have commissioned Puerling to create original arrangements for them, including The Manhattan Transfer, Chanticleer, and Glad.

Works
This is a partial list, and may contain inaccuracies.

In fall 2014, The University of North Texas College of Music and Music Library acquired the collection of Grammy-winning vocal arranger Gene Puerling. Plans are underway to release new editions of Puerling’s music through a new publishing entity, North Texas Jazz Press.

Discography (as arranger)

Notes

1929 births
2008 deaths
Musicians from Milwaukee
Singers from Wisconsin
People from San Anselmo, California
Grammy Award winners
20th-century American singers
20th-century American male singers